Baron Levin Rauch de Nyék (6 October 1819 – 25 August 1890) was an Austrian-Hungarian politician and appointed Ban of Croatia-Slavonia between 1867 and 1871. He is most notable for securing victory of the Unionist Party through changing the election law and terrorising those who were able to vote.

Life

His father was Dániel Freiherr Rauch de Nyék (1778–1831), while his mother was Erzsébet Farkas de Nagyjóka (1787–1858). His grandfather was Paul (Pavao) Freiherr Rauch de Nyék (c.1739–1815), colonel, who received on 6 April 1763 from Queen Maria Theresia the title of Freiherr (or Baron). His paternal grandmother was Anna Szegedy de Mezőszeged. Paul Freiherr Rauch de Nyék was promoted to Major-General in 1765.

Rauch was a member of the unionist party that advocated an integration of Croatia and Kingdom of Hungary. After the Revolutions of 1848, Croatia became a Habsburg crown territory separate from Hungary, but when the Austrian-Hungarian Ausgleich was signed, Austria-Hungary was created and Rauch was appointed as the acting ban (or viceroy) of Croatia on 27 June 1867. By this, the Croatian autonomy within the Hungarian kingdom was automatically abolished. During this time a new Croatian–Hungarian Settlement was negotiated and put in effect by which Croatia reinstated some of its earlier autonomy, but also lost some other rights. Rauch was made the official ban on 8 December 1868 and remained in office until 26 January 1871.

References

Bibliography

1819 births
1890 deaths
People from Zaprešić
Hungarian politicians
Bans of Croatia
Knights Commander of the Order of Saint Stephen of Hungary